Pamulang is a district (kecamatan) within the city of South Tangerang, Banten Province, Indonesia. The district covers an area of 26.82 km2 and had a population at the 2020 Census of 305,563.

References

South Tangerang
Districts of Banten